Arif Khan Joy (born 20 November 1971) is a Bangladeshi politician and a retired Bangladesh National Football player captain.

Football
Joy played for Bangladesh National Football Team from 2003 until 2008 and was a member of the SAFF Championship winning squad. He was the captain of the team during 2005–06.

Honours

Bangladesh
 SAFF Championship: 2003

Politics
Joy was elected as a Member of Parliament for the Netrokona-2 constituency in 2014. He is a member of the Bangladesh Awami League party. A former professional footballer and vice president of the Bangladesh Football Federation, Joy has been appointed as Deputy Minister in the Ministry of Youth and Sports, the first former professional athlete to hold a position in this ministry.

Controversy 
Joy allegedly vandalized the office of a joint-secretary in the sports ministry in 2015. He was also alleged to assault an on-duty police officer, who subsequently filed a case against him in 2016.

References

Living people
Awami League politicians
Footballers at the 2002 Asian Games
Bangladeshi footballers
Association football midfielders
10th Jatiya Sangsad members
Place of birth missing (living people)
Asian Games competitors for Bangladesh
1971 births
Bangladesh international footballers
Deputy Ministers of Youth and Sports (Bangladesh)